Coronel Dorrego is a town in Buenos Aires Province, Argentina. It is the administrative centre for Coronel Dorrego Partido.

Provincial Festival of the Plains
Fiesta Provincial de las Llanuras has been held in Coronel Dorrego since the 1960s, the festival celebrates the Gaucho traditions and features a grand asado in the town square.

External links

Populated places in Buenos Aires Province
Populated places established in 1881
1881 establishments in Argentina